Pandit Deendayal Upadhyaya Shekhawati University, formerly Shekhawati University, is a state university situated in the village Katrathal, in Sikar district,  from Sikar, in Rajasthan, India. The university caters the study needs of the students from the Shekhawati region.

History
The university was established in the year 2012 by Rajasthan Legislative Assembly by passing Shekhawati University, Sikar Act, 2012. The jurisdiction of university is Shekhawati region which comprises the Sikar, Jhunjhunu and Churu districts of Rajasthan. The university was renamed in 2014 through the Shekhawati University, Sikar (Change of Name)
Act, 2014.

Campus
The university was allotted  of land near to the village Katrathal on state highway 8 to construct its campus. The university operated from a temporary campus in Sikar, behind the Government Girls College, while the campus was under construction. In 2021 the university shifted to the permanent campus.

See also
 List of universities in Rajasthan
 List of state universities in India

References

External links
 

 

Universities in Rajasthan
Education in Sikar district
Educational institutions established in 2012
2012 establishments in Rajasthan